Radiator is a 2014 British drama film directed by Tom Browne and co-written with Daniel Cerqueira, who also stars in the film along with Richard Johnson and Gemma Jones. The film was released on 27 November 2015 and received critical acclaim for its direction, acting, humour and emotion.

Premise
Daniel's life is turned upside down when he is summoned to his parents' remote farm in order to help them adjust to their new squalor.

Cast
 Daniel Cerqueira as Daniel
 Julia Ford as Jean
 Richard Johnson as Leonard
 Gemma Jones as Maria
 Frankie Browne as Charlie

Monty portrayed Captain, Leonard and Maria's dog.

Production
Filming took place in the Lake District in Cumbria.

Radiator was Johnson's final film prior to his death on 5 June 2015.

Release
Radiator premiered at the London Film Festival on 15 October 2014. The film was released in the United Kingdom on 27 November 2015.

Accolades
Fisher was nominated for "Breakthrough British Filmmaker" at the London Film Critics Circle Awards 2015, but he lost to John Maclean for Slow West.
Radiator won the Audience Award at Glasgow Film Festival 2015.

References

External links
 
 

2014 films
2010s French-language films
2014 drama films
British drama films
Films about dysfunctional families
Films shot in Cumbria
Picturehouse films
2010s English-language films
2010s British films
2014 multilingual films
British multilingual films